Seanice Kacungira is a Ugandan journalist and radio personality.

Career
She worked for Kenyan (Capital FM) and Ugandan Media (Sanyu FM, WBS and NTV).

Seanice and her younger sister Nancy Kacungira together co-founded Blu Flamingo, a digital media management company.

Awards 
She was recognized as one of Africa's Most Influential Women in Business and Government.

Personal life 
She is married to Fabian Adeoye Lojede and a mother of two. She later changed her name to Seanice Lojede after her marriage.

References

Ugandan journalists
Living people
Year of birth missing (living people)
Place of birth missing (living people)
Ugandan women journalists
Ugandan radio presenters
Ugandan women radio presenters
Ugandan women company founders